This article discusses the phonological system of Standard Bulgarian. Most scholars agree that contemporary Bulgarian has 45 phonemes but different authors place the real number of Bulgarian phonemes between 42 and 47, depending on whether one includes or excludes phonemes which appear primarily only in borrowed foreign words.

Vowels

Bulgarian vowels may be grouped in three pairs according to their backness: the front vowels е and и, the central vowels а and ъ and the back vowels о and у. In stressed syllables, six vowels are phonemic. Unstressed vowels tend to be shorter and weaker compared to their stressed counterparts, and the corresponding pairs of open and closed vowels approach each other with a tendency to merge, above all as low (open and open-mid) vowels are raised and shift towards the high (close and close-mid) ones. However, the coalescence is not always complete. The vowels are often distinguished in emphatic or deliberately distinct pronunciation, and reduction is strongest in colloquial speech. Besides that, some linguists distinguish two degrees of reduction, as they have found that a clearer distinction tends to be maintained in the syllable immediately preceding the stressed one. The complete merger of the pair  –  is regarded as most common, while the status of  vs  is less clear. The  vowel itself does not exist as a phoneme in other Slavic languages, though a similar reduced vowel transcribed as  does occur.

Semivowels
The Bulgarian language contains only one semivowel: . ('flat iron'), but   ('Jordan').

However [w] may be an allophone of /ɫ/ among some younger speakers. It may also be found in English loan words.

Consonants
Bulgarian has a total of 35 consonant phonemes (see table below). They are, however, normally not considered part of the phonetic inventory of the Bulgarian language. The Bulgarian obstruent consonants are divided into 12 pairs of voiced and voiceless consonants. The only obstruent without a counterpart is the voiceless velar fricative . The voicing contrast is neutralized in word-final position, where all obstruents are voiceless, at least with regard to the official orthoepy of the contemporary Bulgarian spoken language (word-final devoicing is a common feature in Slavic languages); this neutralization is, however, not reflected in spelling.

This effectively reduces the consonant inventory to merely 22 phonemes. No ambiguity arises from such analysis since the palatalized consonants occur only before vowels, and never before other consonants or in the syllable coda as they do in some other languages with palatalized consonants (for example, in the fellow Slavic language Russian).

A phonological table based on this reanalysis is shown below:

For example,   ('inflation').

Examples:   ('thin' neut.),   ('tango').

  is voiced  at word boundaries before voiced obstruents. Example:   ('I saw him').

 Described as having "only slight friction".

It is always written as the Cyrillic letter ⟨⟩  in Bulgarian orthography. Allophone of /ɫ/ among some younger speakers, possible ongoing sound change

Hard and palatalized consonants
Like a number of Eastern Slavic languages, most consonant phonemes come in "hard" and "soft" pairs. The latter tend to feature palatalization, or the raising of the tongue toward the hard palate.

In certain contexts, the contrast hard/soft contrast is neutralized. The latter pre-front realization is traditionally called "soft l" (though it is not phonetically palatalized). In some Western Bulgarian dialects, this allophonic variation does not exist.

Similar developments, termed L-vocalization, have occurred in many languages, including Polish, Slovene, Serbo-Croatian, Brazilian Portuguese, French, and English.

Palatalization
During the palatalization of most hard consonants (the bilabial, labiodental and alveolar ones), the middle part of the tongue is lifted towards the palate, resulting in the formation of a second articulatory centre whereby the specific palatal "clang" of the soft consonants is achieved.

Word stress
Stress is not usually marked in written text. In cases where the stress must be indicated, a grave accent is placed on the vowel of the stressed syllable.

Bulgarian word stress is dynamic. Stressed syllables are louder and longer than unstressed ones. As in Russian and other East Slavic languages, Bulgarian stress is also lexical rather than fixed as in French, Latin or the West Slavic languages. It may fall on any syllable of a polysyllabic word, and its position may vary depending on the inflection and derivation, for example:
 nouns –   ('man'),   ('the man'),   ('men'),   ('the men')
 verbs –   ('I am going'),    ('go!')

Bulgarian stress is also distinctive: the following examples are only differentiated by stress (see the different vowels):
 nouns
   ('wool'),   ('wave')
    ('steam'),   ('coin')
 verbs
   ('when he comes'),   (when he came')
   ('explosive'),   ('exploded') 

Stress usually isn't signified in written text, even in the above examples, if the context makes the meaning clear. However, the grave accent may be written if confusion is likely. 

The stress is often written in order to signify a dialectal deviation from the standard pronunciation:
   ('he told me'), instead of  
   ('he wanted to come'), instead of  )

Notes

References

Bibliography

 
 
 
 
 

Phonology
Slavic phonologies